DAAD may refer to:

 The German Academic Exchange Service (German Deutscher Akademischer Austauschdienst)
 DAAD Artists-in-Berlin Program
 Direct Action Against Drugs, a cover name for the Provisional Irish Republican Army
 Damnation and a Day, a 2003 album by extreme metal band Cradle of Filth
 Democratic Alliance Against Dictatorship, a political group in Thailand